The British Hovercraft Corporation SR.N3 was a 37.5 ton hovercraft originally designed by Saunders-Roe. 

Launched in 1963, it was primarily aimed at military deployment. It was a military version of the SR.N2

Propulsion and lift was provided by four rear-mounted Bristol-Siddeley Gnome gas turbine engines that allowed the SR.N3 to cruise at 70 knots. The British IHTU (Interservice Hovercraft Trials Unit), based at Browndown, Stokes Bay, tested the SR.N3 in a wide variety of conditions, including ice. On 16 September 1964 an SR.N3 operated satisfactorily in a full gale and six foot seas. The SR.N3 never entered full service and ended up being used for target practice.

References

External links
 SR.N3 - Hovercraft Museum

Military hovercraft
Saunders-Roe